Groß Kiesow is a railway station in the town of Groß Kiesow, Mecklenburg-Vorpommern, Germany. The station lies of the Angermünde–Stralsund railway and the train services are operated by Deutsche Bahn and Usedomer Bäderbahn.

Train services
The station is served by the following services:
  Stralsund - Greifswald - Pasewalk - Angermünde - Berlin - Ludwigsfelde - Jüterbog - Falkenberg
  (Rostock -) Stralsund - Greifswald - Züssow

References

Railway stations in Mecklenburg-Western Pomerania
Railway stations in Germany opened in 1894
Buildings and structures in Vorpommern-Greifswald